Plouigneau is a commune in the Finistère department of Brittany in north-western France. On 1 January 2019, the former commune Le Ponthou was merged into Plouigneau.

Population
Inhabitants of Plouigneau are called in French Ignaciens.

See also
Communes of the Finistère department

References

External links

Mayors of Finistère Association 

Communes of Finistère

Communes nouvelles of Finistère